Borja is a town in the Guairá Department of Paraguay.

Population

According to the 2002 Census this district has a total population of 9222 inhabitants. Only 3.2% of the total population lives in the urban area, 298 inhabitants.

Location
It is located in the south-western part of the Guairá department. Its urban area is located only 2 km away from the San Salvador urban area.

From Asunción you have to follow the National Route 2 until the city of Coronel Oviedo. There taking the detour of the Route 8 you get to the city of Villarrica, capital of the department, and 12 kilometers to the south and taking a non-asphalted road traveling 18 kilometers more you'll get to Borja.

Populated places in the Guairá Department